The Blue Ridge Marathon - America's Toughest Road Marathon - is an annual marathon, half marathon, 10K, team relay, and double marathon held in both Roanoke and Roanoke County, Virginia, United States. Officially announced on August 12, 2009, the inaugural event occurred on April 24, 2010. The course starts in Downtown Roanoke and finishes in Elmwood Park. The race is a boutique run that attracts approximately 3000 runners. The beneficiary of the marathon is the Friends of the Blue Ridge Parkway, a group dedicated to the preservation of the Blue Ridge Parkway.

The Course
The  course starts in Elmwood Park in Downtown Roanoke. From the start, the course turns to the south along Virginia State Route 116 (Jefferson Street) prior to beginning the ascent up Mill Mountain along Walnut Street. From Mill Mountain, the course continues in a southwesterly course to the Blue Ridge Parkway, where the ascent up Roanoke Mountain begins at the  mark. Following the descent down the mountain, runners reenter the Parkway and make the descent down Mill Mountain near the Mill Mountain Star. After the descent, runners then wind along the Roanoke River and through the South Roanoke, Wasena and West End neighborhoods prior to reaching the finish in Elmwood Park.

History
The first marathon held in Roanoke was organized by the local running organization, the Star City Striders, and held in 1983 as the Star City Marathon. The event would be held again in 1984 before being shortened to a half marathon in 1985 due to severe flooding resulting from Hurricane Juan. The marathon returned in 1986, but was discontinued the following year and replaced with an annual half marathon and 5K. The announcement in August 2009 for the 2010 event marked the return of a marathon to the Roanoke Valley for the first time since the 1986 event.

Announced on August 12, 2009, by Roanoke representative Bob Goodlatte, securing a portion of the Blue Ridge Parkway to hold the event involved a bi-partisan effort from congresspersons whose districts the Parkway traverses. In addition to Goodlatte, representatives Rick Boucher Tom Perriello, Virginia Foxx, Patrick McHenry and Heath Shuler all gave their support to for holding the event. The inaugural, 2010 event was scheduled to coincide with the 75th anniversary of the Blue Ridge Parkway and be included as part of the year-long celebration. In 2010 the official event name was the Blue Ridge Marathon on the Parkway, but in 2011 the name was shortened to Blue Ridge Marathon and is also known as Foot Levelers Blue Ridge Marathon because of title sponsor, Foot Levelers, Inc (since 2012).

The race is put on by the Roanoke Outside Foundation, a nonprofit with a mission of connecting people outdoors. The Roanoke Outside Foundation was created as an economic development initiative by the Roanoke Regional Partnership to leverage natural assets to attract talent and investment to the region.

The inaugural race was held on Saturday, April 24, 2010, with 324 runners completing the marathon and 450 completing the half-marathon.

The annual streak of races was broken in 2020 due to the COVID-19 pandemic. In early March, the Center for Disease Control suggested the cancelation of all gatherings of 50 or more people. As a result, on March 16, the race organizers canceled the 10th running of the Blue Ridge Marathon as well as all other races held that weekend.

Marathon winners

Course Records
The full and half marathon courses were altered and USTAF certified in 2014.

DOUBLE MARATHON

Male: Michael Fisher (age 34), Asheville, NC. Time: 8:05:02 (2018)

Female: Margaret Smith (age 37), Baltimore, MD. Time: 9:10:13 (2017)

FULL MARATHON

Male: Tim Gruber (age 23), Richmond, VA. Time: 2:44:48 (2018)

Female: Lorraine Young (age 40), Raleigh, NC. Time: 3:13:46 (2014)

HALF MARATHON

Male: Tyler Obrien (age 21), Jacksonville, FL. Time: 1:21:57 (2016)

Female: Mina Demarco (age 30). Time: 1:31:41 (2014)

STAR 10k

Male: Tyler O’Brien (age 23). Jacksonville, FL. Time: 34:51 (2018)

Female: Sarah Glenn (33). Roanoke, VA. Time: 42:26 (2018)

4-PERSON RELAY RECORD

Rich's Bich's. Time: 3:32:47 (2017)

References

External links
Blue Ridge Marathon official website
Title Sponsor Foot Levelers, Inc. official website

Marathons in the United States
Sports in Roanoke, Virginia
Recurring sporting events established in 2010